The first Korean student movement begun in 1919, when students took part in the Sam-il Movement of 1 March to call for the end of Japanese colonization. The student movement has since then played a major part in several big political changes in Korea. Before liberation of Korea from Japanese rule in 1945, the main focus of the student movement was opposing this rule and demanding Korea's independence. After 1945, the student movements were mainly concerned with righting alleged wrongs in the Korean government. Students rose for instance against the South Korea's government of Syngman Rhee after the allegedly rigged elections in March 1960. 1980 marked a turning point in the South Korean student movement. After the Gwangju massacre in May 1980, the student movement got a clear vision, based on Marxism. Student activism is still common on the 21st century South Korean political scene.

History

Under Japanese rule

1919, participation in the Sam-Il Movement (3.1 or March first movement) 
The first incentive for the student movement was the oppressive rule of the Japanese over Korea and U.S. president Woodrow Wilson's call for the 'Self determination of Nations' following World War I. The March first Movement (3.1 Movement) was a nationwide anti-Japan independence movement against Japanese colonial rule. Although the students did not lead in the major uprisings of 1 March 1919, their activities influenced the leaders of the Sam-Il movement. The protest spread from Namdaemun square in Seoul, Pyeongyang and Gwangju to rural areas through people going to the Gojong funeral (高宗, Joseon 26th king). The 3.1 Movement is the first and largest national movement that started in a colony of a country that was victorious after the first World War.

10 June 1926 movement 
Students demonstrated and distributed a manifesto for independence in the Sunjong funeral line. Over 200 students were arrested.

Gwangju student movement November 1929 – March 1930 
The Gwangju student movement was a nationwide anti-Japan demonstration. It was founded against the discrimination towards colonial education and ethnic discrimination against Korean students in the Japanese colonial period. This movement was triggered when Japanese students harassed a female Korean student. A large scale street demonstration started in Gwangju and spread nationwide. The Gwangju movement was a large scale ethnic movement against Japanese imperialism after the 3.1 movement.

After 15 August 1945 liberation

19 April uprising 1960 
On 11 April 1960 nearly a month after the demonstrations against the rigged elections on 15 March, the body of a high school boy with a police tear-gas grenade lodged into his skull was pulled out of a river in Masan. Already antagonized by the election and how the government had handled the protests thus far, the people of Masan exploded in fury. On 18 April, several student leaders at the Korea University in Seoul mobilized a demonstration and led 3,000 students in a march to the National Assembly building. The protesters demanded a new, fair election. They didn't get a response however and the next day, 19 April, approximately 50,000 students forced their way past the police and met in front of the principal government buildings in the centre of Seoul. They had come from thirty different colleges and high schools, and represented almost all the major universities in Seoul.

Already before the elections on 15 March 1960, there was growing unrest among the Korean people. The South Korean economy was hit by a crisis because of a change in economic policy. Poverty ruled among the rural areas because residents moved to the city to look for work, but still the unemployment rate was at 34.2%. President Syngman Rhee tried to forcefully keep the populace in line but this only showed the undemocratic nature of his regime. The students wanted a reform of the election system, but were thwarted when Rhee rigged the elections.

1970–1980 
During the 1980s, student movements in Korea became an important force in the political climate of South Korea. The turning point can be placed at the Gwangju Massacre in May 1980. This massacre gave the student movement a clear goal: revolution. The 1980s student movement can also be distinguished from its predecessors by its Marxist perspective.

The reason of the movement's existence can, however, be traced through the 1960s and 1970s.  The generation who led the movement have later been called the 386 Generation. These people went to college in the 1980s and had experienced the oppression of both students and labour first hand.

After Korea's liberation by both USSR and US troops, the Rhee-regime and the Korean War, the South Korean government wanted to suppress all forms of political dissidence. All forms of political dissidence were treated as pro-communist and pro-North Korea and all such dissidence was prosecuted under the National Security Law. Besides this violent oppression of political dissidence, South Korea also underwent rapid state-led capitalist reform and industrialization. This led to a depletion of workforce in agriculture and a decrease of the rural population. The working conditions in the factories were deplorable. All civil liberty restrictions were justified under the Yushin system supposedly to discipline the workforce in the face of the threat of North Korea. The strict labor laws were violently enforced.

The Yushin system led to great discontent among intellectuals and students in the 1970s and made campuses around South Korea spaces for antigovernment activism. Dissidence was practiced through small reading groups and educational activities provided by religious human rights organizations to escape governmental scrutiny.

Students also became involved in distributing critical opinions through an underground press and many students who were expelled from school due to their activities were believed to have gone into the publishing business, where critical journalists had formed the Council for Democratic Press.

Three main political camps can be distinguished in the Korean student movement of the 1980s: The National Liberation (NL), the National Democracy (ND) and the People's Democracy. Although they leaned on different political views, all facilitated several organizations and together they managed to mobilize two major demonstrations. In the so-called 'Great June Democratic Struggle' in 1987, over a million people attended an illegal street riot that led to a sweeping political change including a direct presidential election. The second protest was the 'Great Worker Struggle', which opened up the path for an independent trade union movement.

January 1987 torture and death of Park Jong-Chul  
The Chun Doo Hwan administration, oppressed a pro-democracy movement by force of arms. In this process, many citizens and students were tortured by the police force.

The torture and death of Park Jong-Chul is one of these cases. Although the police announced that this affair was simply a shock death, they later officially admitted to torturing Jong-Chul with water after an autopsy was done on the body. After part of the affair's truth was revealed, the opposition party launched a new offense against the Chun Doo Hwan administration. A memorial rally related to this affair led to the June Democracy Movement in 1987.

June 1987 death of Lee Han-Yeol 
As demonstrations intensified, students in Yonsei University swore to take to the field and demonstrated at the university on 9 June 1987. During the protest, Yonsei student Lee Han-yeol was seriously injured when a tear gas grenade penetrated his skull and he died on July 5. Through these affairs, citizens became distrustful towards the Chun Doo Hwan administration and democratic resistance was extended, with the June Democracy Movement established at the peak. The Chun Doo Hwan administration agreed to revise the constitution for a direct election system.

Park Mi wrote that "the student generation of the 1980s played a pivotal role in the democratization of South Korean society".

Present

2008 candlelight vigil 

After the discovery of mad cow disease in the United States, a candle light vigil was held to oppose the import of beef into South Korea from the United States. In response, the South Korean government suspended the import of beef. However, on 11 April 2008 the Lee Myungbak government initiated a deal with the US to restart import of beef. This sparked criticism that the government sold the people's life and health.

On 2 May 2008, students and other citizens held another candle light vigil to show opposition to the beef import. At the first meeting, more than sixty percent of the participants were high school girls. The vigil continued for more than a hundred days and the issue finally became political. Hundreds of thousands of people participated in the rally during its peak in June and July. Finally the government mobilized the police and arrested a large number of participants. These people were put on trial for assembly and demonstration, and obstruction of ordinary traffic.

2011 demonstration for university tuition 

In the election pledge, the new government promised to lower university tuition, but they failed to fulfill this pledge, funding being the biggest problem. College students and related organizations demanded that the government implement its pledge, saying that tuition is too expensive and students are too busy with their part-time jobs to properly attend to their school work. Civil society and the university students demonstrated every day. The students even did the 10,000 bae, 10,000 bows, aimed at removing 10,000 earthly desires, for a lower tuition fee. Eventually, the government did not implement the promised half-tuition fee, but they did increase the government scholarship for the low-income bracket.

2015–16 demonstration for comfort women agreement 

A number of NGOs and international organizations tried to investigate and resolve the essence of the comfort women issue for 25 years. On 28 December 2015, South Korea and Japan came to an agreement regarding 'comfort women' or abducted Korean women who were forced to work as sex slaves for Japanese soldiers during World War II.   Representatives of colleges and citizens however declared this agreement inadequate. Eunhye Choi, president of the student body of Ewha Womans University, declared "The voice of the victims was excluded" and "There wasn't an apology from Japan. It is a disgraceful agreement. Comfort women victims desired to be made clear about responsibility for forced mobilized labour at national level, formal apology, legal compensation, recording on textbook and punishment. So that the same thing and victimization would not occur again in this land."

Student demonstrations were held at Kyonggi University at Seoul, Kyunghee University, Korea University, Dongguk University, Busan College of Education, Pusan National University, Sogang University, Seoul National University, Sungshin Women’s University, Sejong University, Yonsei University, Ewha Womans University, Hakuk University of Foreign Studies, Hanyang University, and Hongik University with attendees including 25 student body presidents and 250 national university student unions. 

Activists, including many students, staged various protests against the agreement as late as January 2016.

2016 protests

See also 

Hanchongryun

References 

Student politics
Social movements in South Korea
Korean independence movement
Protests in Korea
20th century in South Korea
21st century in South Korea
Political repression in South Korea
South Korean democracy movements